Seyyed Ahmad may refer to:
 Seyyed Ahmad, Hormozgan
 Seyyed Ahmad, Kermanshah
 Seyyed Ahmad, Khuzestan